Vena di Maida also known as Vena is a village in Maida, Catanzaro, Calabria, Italy.  It has a population of 879 making it a village.Vena is 242 meters above sea level.

Reference 

Cities and towns in Calabria